Captain Lincoln F. Sternn is a comic book character created by Bernie Wrightson.

Personality and appearance 
Captain Sternn is considered "part Han Solo, part James Garner from The Great Escape". The character, as written by Wrightson, is an amoral space captain whose adventures are set in the future. Sternn is sometimes considered a criminal with charges ranging from rape to piracy.

He is associated with supporting characters Hanover Fiste and Justine Tyme.

He is drawn as a caricature of Superman, although his clothing is different; he wears a pseudo-military uniform. He is always accompanied by a small, levitating one-eyed robot, named Beezer, that is his most faithful companion.

Creation
First conceptualized in the late 1970s, Captain Sternn was developed by artist Bernie Wrightson during his time at The Studio. The character's first published adventure was developed for Tyrannosaurus Press in 1977, and it was eventually published in 1980 in Heavy Metal magazine.

Publication history 
 Heavy Metal Vol.4, #3 (June, 1980) - "Captain Sternn" (reprinted in Heavy Metal Special: One Step Beyond (January, 1996))
 Dreadstar #6 (September, 1983)
 Amazing Heroes #194 (September, 1991)
 Captain Stern: Running Out of Time #1-5 (1993 - 1994)
 Heavy Metal: The Movie (October, 1996) - "Captain Sternn"

Film adaptation
Captain Sternn's original story was adapted as the segment "Captain Sternn" of the 1981 film Heavy Metal. He was voiced by Eugene Levy where the rest of the cast in that segment consist of Rodger Bumpass as Hanover Fiste, Joe Flaherty as Sternn's lawyer Charlie, John Vernon as the prosecutor, and Douglas Kenney as the bailiff Regolian. The film added a scene at the end of the segment, not in the original comic, where Sternn opens a trap door under Hanover Fiste ejecting him into space.

References in other works
Hanover Fiste was mentioned by name several times in the Dreadstar book, both in the Bernie Wrightson stories starring Aldo Gorney published in issue #6-7  and by Tuetun in issue #12.

Hanover Fiste's lines were used in the Webcomic Freefall. The judge uttering the lines, looked similar to the animated version of Hanover Fiste from the Heavy Metal movie.

Notes

 This is the comic version of the segment "Captain Sternn" of the Heavy Metal film, not the original story.

External links
Bernie Wrightson Gallery of Captain Sternn Art

Fictional con artists
Fictional drug dealers
Fictional rapists
Captain Sternn
Captain Sternn
Space pirates